Jim Bailey may refer to:
 Jim Bailey (American football) (born 1948), American football player
 Jim Bailey (baseball) (1934–2022), American Major League Baseball pitcher
 Jim Bailey (entertainer) (1938–2015), American singer, actor, and female impressionist
 Jim Bailey (cricketer) (1908–1988), English cricketer
 Jim Bailey (athlete) (1929–2020), Australian runner, competed at 1956 Olympics

See also
 James Bailey (disambiguation)